Minerva was a torpedo cruiser of the  built for the Italian Regia Marina (Royal Navy) in the 1880s. The second of eight ships, Minerva was built by Gio. Ansaldo & C.; her keel was laid down in February 1889, she was launched in February 1892, and she was commissioned in August that year. Her main armament were her five torpedo tubes, which were supported by a battery of ten small-caliber guns. Minerva spent most of her career in the main Italian fleet, where she was primarily occupied with training exercises. She was converted into a minelayer in 1909–10. She did not see significant action during the Italo-Turkish War in 1911 or World War I in 1915–18, though she was used to lay defensive minefields during the latter conflict. The ship was sold for scrap in 1921.

Design

The Partenope-class cruisers were derivatives of the earlier, experimental s, themselves based on the preceding cruiser . The doctrine emphasized the use of small, torpedo-armed craft to destroy expensive ironclads.

She displaced  normally. The ship had a short forecastle deck that terminated at the conning tower. She had a crew of between 96 and 121 personnel.

Her propulsion system consisted of a pair of horizontal triple-expansion steam engines each driving a single screw propeller. Steam was supplied by four coal-fired locomotive boilers, which were vented through two widely spaced funnels.

Minerva was armed with a main battery of one  /40 gun placed on the forecastle. Close-range defense against torpedo boats was provided by a secondary battery of six  /43 guns mounted singly. She was also equipped with three  /20 guns in single mounts. Her primary offensive weapon was her six  torpedo tubes.

Service history
Minerva was laid down on 1 February 1889 at the Gio. Ansaldo & C. shipyard in Genoa, and was launched on 27 February 1892. After fitting-out work was completed less than six months later, the ship was commissioned into the fleet on 20 August. During the maneuvers, which lasted from 6 August to 5 September, the ships of the Reserve Squadron defended against a simulated attack by the Active Squadron, which gamed a French attack on the Italian fleet. In 1895, Minerva was stationed in the 2nd Maritime Department, split between Taranto and  Naples, along with most of the torpedo cruisers in the Italian fleet.

Minerva served in the active squadron in 1902. In 1903, Minerva was assigned to the 1st Squadron, along with Euridice. The unit also included eight battleships, six other cruisers, and six destroyers. The 1st Squadron was kept in active service for seven months of the year for training, and had reduced crews for the remainder of the year. She remained in the squadron the following year, which was reduced in size, with the two oldest battleships having been withdrawn, though three destroyers were added. Between 1909 and 1910, the ship was modernized and converted into a minelayer. She received new oil-fired boilers and had her armament reduced to two  guns, four 57 mm guns and two 37 mm guns. At the start of the Italo-Turkish War in September 1911, Minerva was attached to the 4th Division of the 2nd Squadron of the Italian fleet. By this time, she was being used as a minelayer. She did not see significant action during the war.

Italy had declared neutrality at the start of World War I, but by July 1915, the Triple Entente had convinced the Italians to enter the war against the Central Powers. Admiral Paolo Thaon di Revel, the Italian naval chief of staff, believed that the threat from Austro-Hungarian submarines and naval mines in the narrow waters of the Adriatic was too serious for him to use the fleet in an active way. Instead, Revel decided to implement a blockade at the relatively safer southern end of the Adriatic with the main fleet, while smaller vessels, such as the MAS boats, conducted raids on Austro-Hungarian ships and installations. Minerva was initially used to lay a series of defensive minefields, along with her sister Partenope and the cruiser , in support of this strategy. Minerva survived the war and was discarded in May 1921, the last surviving member of her class. She was subsequently broken up for scrap.

Footnotes

Notes

Citations

References

External links
 Minerva Marina Militare website

1892 ships
Partenope-class cruisers
Ships built by Gio. Ansaldo & C.
World War I cruisers of Italy
Ships built in Genoa